Intag is a remote, partly mountainous area in Cotacachi Canton and Otavalo Canton Imbabura Province, Ecuador, named for the Intag river. It includes Intag Cloud Forest Reserve, which has primary cloud forest at 1800–2800 m and a high biodiversity. Cotacachi Cayapas Ecological Reserve borders to the North.

Geography 
Intag is approximately 1800 meters above sea level. Parts of the Intag region are sub-tropical rainforests in the Andes. The Andes there are steep and rugged.  Including the Intag river, there are other rivers and streams in the mountains.

Biodiversity and Environment 
Intag includes or used to include one of the areas with the highest biodiversity on earth. It harbors numerous endangered species, including the spectacled bear, the harlequin frog, and the jaguar.

The region faces various environmental concerns.  Reforestation takes place in Intag. A Mitsubishi subsidiary, which had contaminated Junín river and caused deforestation, was expelled in 1997.

DECOIN (Defensa y Conservación Ecológica de Intag) an environmental organization, has been founded in 1995 and has created a sensitivity concerning a possible destruction of this environment.

Mining 
In 2002, the ministry of energy and mining offered mining concessions in Intag publicly. Canadian mining corporation Ascendant Copper received those in 2004. There was resistance against by Radio Intag., which has existed since 2007. he intention of mining is opposed by locals. Locals were threatened and beaten by security staff hired by Ascendant Copper. Not only human rights abuses by companies, but also by government have occurred. Ascendant Copper would face difficulties and created a plan to buy land.

The Inter-American Human Rights Commission Organization was informed. With support of Canadian organizations Friends of Nature and MiningWatch Canada, a claim against Ascendant Copper for having violated safeguards established in standards for multinational companies was filed with the OECD. In 2005, three months before Copper Mesa (then Ascendant Copper) was listed on the Toronto Stock Exchange, County Mayor Auki Tituaña wrote to the Finance and Audit Committee of the Toronto Stock Exchange: "We consider it to be appropriate and fair that before accepting open "trade" of Ascendant Copper Corporation's stocks in the Stock Market, you evaluate in depth the "new" company's merits..."

 The government of Ecuador has since prohibited any activity of Ascendant Copper in Ecuador. ODELCO of Chile and ENAMI are exploring the area.

In 2002, the Ministry of Energy and Mines auctioned off 7,000 hectares of subsoil rights in Junín.
The following year, Cotacachi Municipality, six parishes, communities and NGOs requested a restraining order from the courts.

Under Rich Earth is a film covering this inter alia and was debuted at  Toronto International Film Festival.

Population 
Intag had a population of 14,000 people in 2000. Its parishes in Cotacachi Canton were Apuela, García Moreno, Vacas Galindo, Peñaherrera, Cuellaje and Plaza Gutiérrez. Intag has more than 90 hamlets.
 The population of Intag partly is of indigenous or African origin. In the 2001 census, malnutrition and poverty exceeded 60% of the population.
Its natural environment mainly is its livelihood.
Many residents of Intag make their living by subsistence farming or cattle raising.  Numerous Intag people grow coffee on their farms, many of whom participating in a fairetrade-growers' association.

Hydropower 
  Intag has numerous hydrologic reserves. The people from Intag see the forests as their core source of water.
There is a hydropower project, which faces resistance.

References 

Environment of Ecuador